Sultan Sharif Ali Islamic University (Malay: Universiti Islam Sultan Sharif Ali;  abbreviated UNISSA; Arabic: جامعة السّلطان الشّريف عليّ الإسلاميّة) is Brunei's second university. It was established in 2007 as the first national Islamic university in Brunei.

History
The idea to open a second university in Brunei was first addressed by His Majesty Sultan Hassanal Bolkiah in his Titah delivered at University of Brunei Darussalam's 16th convocation in 2004 and again in 2005 at UBD's 17th convocation whereby His Majesty had stated that the second university shall be an Islamic university. The overall aim of the new university is to become a centre for the spread of Islam in the region.

The university took its name from the Sharifate of Mecca, Barkat Ali ibnu Sharif Ajlan ibnu Sharif Rumaithah, known as Sultan Sharif Ali, who was a descendant of Islamic prophet Muhammad and appointed as the third Sultan of Brunei after marrying the daughter of the previous sultan. He was the first sultan to build a mosque in Brunei; it was destroyed during Allied bombing in 1945/46.

On 11 Zulhijjah 1427AH (1 January 2007), Universiti Islam Sultan Sharif Ali was established. UNISSA received its first batch of students in August 2007. 125 undergraduates and 27 postgraduate students were admitted. On its launch UNISSA absorbed academic and non-academic staff as well as its students from the Sultan Haji Omar Ali Saifuddien Institute of Islamic Studies (IPI SHOAS) which had hitherto been a part of UBD. At the time, UNISSA did not have their own premises and had to use IPI SHOAS as their base.

In February 2009 the university moved to a temporary campus in Gadong at the former Pengiran Anak Puteri Rashidah College of Nursing to allow more room for expansion and facilities.

Programmes

Certificate
Certificate of Shariah Criminal Justice System

National Diploma
National Diploma Da'ie and Leadership

Higher National diploma
Higher National Diploma Dirasat Islamiyyah
Higher National Diploma Shariah Criminal Justice System

Bachelor degrees
Bachelor of Usuluddin (Tafsir & Hadith) (Arabic)
Bachelor of Usuluddin (Aqidah & Da‘wah) (Arabic)
Bachelor of Usuluddin (Tahfiz & Qira’at) (Arabic)
Bachelor of Shariah (Fiqh & Judiciary) (Arabic)
Bachelor of Shariah (Fiqh & Usul) (Arabic)
Bachelor of Laws (LLB) and Bachelor of Shariah (BSL): double degree (English)
Bachelor of Arabic Language and Translation (Arabic)
Bachelor of Islamic History and Civilization (Arabic)
Bachelor of Development Management (English) 
Bachelor of Science in Islamic Finance (English)
Bachelor of Business Management (English)
Bachelor of Islamic Economics (English) 
Bachelor of Halal Science (English)
Bachelor of Islamic Media and Communication Technology (English)
Bachelor of Science in Agriculture (Agribusiness) (English)

Postgraduate diploma
Diploma in Islamic Law and Legal Practice

Masters
Master of Arabic Language (Coursework & Dissertation)
Master of Arabic Language (Research)
Master of Arabic Language and Translation (Coursework & Dissertation)
Master of Arabic Language and Translation (Coursework)
Master Arabic Language and Translation (Research)
Master of Islamic Banking and Finance (Research)
Master of Islamic Economics (Research)
Master of Development Management (Research)
Master of Islamic History and Civilisation (Research)
Master of Usuluddin (Coursework and Dissertation)
Master of Usuluddin (Coursework)
Master of Usuluddin (Research)
Master of Laws – Intellectual Property Law (Coursework & Dissertation)
Master of Laws – intellectual Property Law (Coursework)
Master of Laws – International Law (Coursework & Dissertation)
Master of Laws – International Law (Coursework)
Master of Laws (Research)
Master of Shariah (Coursework and Dissertation)
Master of Shariah (Research)
Master of Halal Science (Coursework)
Master of Halal Science (Halal Laws) (Coursework & Dissertation)
Master of Halal Science (Halal Laws) (Research)
Master of Halal Science (Halal Management) (Coursework and Dissertation)
Master of Halal Science (Halal Management) (Research)
Master of Mazhab Shafi’i (Research)

Doctorates
PhD in Arabic Language
PhD in Arabic Language and Translation
PhD in Islamic Banking and Finance
PhD in Islamic Economics (Research)
PhD in Development Management
PhD in Islamic History and Civilization (Research)
PhD in Usuluddin (Research)
PhD in law (Research)
PhD in Shariah (Research)
PhD in Halal Science (Halal Laws)
PhD in Halal Science (Halal Management)
PhD in Mazhab Shafi’i (Research)

Faculties and centres
There are seven academic faculties and eight centres in the university.

Faculties
 Faculty of Arabic Language
 Faculty of Usuluddin
 Faculty of Shariah and Law
 Faculty of Islamic Economics and Finance
 Faculty of Islamic Development Management
 Faculty of Islamic Technology
 Faculty of Agriculture

Centres
 Centre for The Promotion of Knowledge and Languages Learning
 Centre for Postgraduate Studies
 Mazhab Shafi'i Research Centre
 Centre for Research and Publication 
 Centre for Public and International Relations 
 Centre for Technology and Multimedia
 Halalan Tayyiban Research Centre
 Leadership and Lifelong Learning Centre

Administration 
:

Rectors
 Pengiran Dato Seri Setia Dr Haji Mohammad Bin Pengiran Haji Abd. Rahman (2007 - 2009)
 Dr Haji Md Yusop Bin Haji Awang Damit (2009 - 2010)
 Dr Haji Serbini Bin Haji Matahir (2010 - 2013)
 Dr Haji Norarfan Bin Haji Zainal (2014 - current)

Deputy Rectors
 Dr Haji Md Yusop Bin Haji Awang Damit (2007 - 2009)
 Pengiran Anak Dr Haji Amiruddin Alam Shah Bin Pengiran Anak Haji Ismail (2010 - 2014)
 Dr Haji Awang Mohammed Hussain Bin Pehin Penyurat Haji Awang Ahmad (2014 - 2021)

Assistant Rectors
 Dr Hajah Masnon Binti Haji Ibrahim (2007 - 2009)
 Pengiran Anak Dr Haji Amiruddin Alam Shah Bin Pengiran Anak Haji Ismail (2009 - 2010)
 Dr Arman Bin Haji Asmad (2014 - current)

References

External links

Universiti Islam Sultan Sharif Ali website

Educational institutions established in 2007
2007 establishments in Brunei
Universities and colleges in Brunei